Brian or Bryan Cox may refer to:

Media and entertainment
Brian Cox (actor) (born 1946), Scottish actor
Brian Cox (director), American film director
Brian Cox (physicist) (born 1968), English physicist, broadcaster and former keyboard player
Brian Cox (special effects artist), American special effects artist
Bryan-Michael Cox (born 1977), American songwriter and record producer

Sports
Brian Cox (footballer) (born 1961), English goalkeeper
Brian Cox (American football) ( 1985–2006), American football coach
Brian Cox (rugby league), Australian rugby league footballer
Bryan Cox (born 1968), American football coach and former player
Bryan Cox Jr. (born 1994), American football defensive end

Other people

Brian Cox (poet) (1928–2008), English scholar, editor of Critical Quarterly and author of the Black Papers